Party Time with Winnie the Pooh (known as Pooh's Party Game: In Search of the Treasure in North America) is a Party video game released for the PlayStation in 2001. It was developed by Doki Denki Studio (the same developer behind Tigger's Honey Hunt) and published by Electronic Arts in the United States and Sony Computer Entertainment Europe in Europe.

It was released as a PlayStation Classic for the PS3 and PSP via the PlayStation Store on 13 September 2009.

Gameplay
The gameplay is similar to Nintendo's Mario Party franchise. The Adventure Mode features Pooh and his friends going around a large board similar to that of a board game, and after each turn one of the mini-games is played. The plot in the single player mode includes elements taken from Winnie the Pooh's Most Grand Adventure.

The minigames include the Bomberman-inspired Tigger's Thunder and Frightening, Rabbit's Roller Racers, Piglet's Pumpkin Hunt, Owl's Fruit 'n' Hoot and Pooh's Pinball Party.

Plot

References

2001 video games
Electronic Arts games
Multiplayer and single-player video games
Party video games
PlayStation (console) games
PlayStation Network games
Sony Interactive Entertainment games
Video games about bears
Video games developed in France
Windows games
Winnie-the-Pooh video games